Akhini, on the banks of the Karmanasa River, is a village of Kamsaar in the Indian state of Bihar. It is a bordering village of Kaimur district of Bihar. As of 2011 census the main population of the village lived in an area 72.5 acres and 741 house holds.

Plantation
When the place came in the zamindari of Raja Narhar Khan he established a large mango orchard here which is also referred to as Lakh Beda Bagh Or Mazaar Wala Bagh. The Orchard, when made, had an area of 1600 Bigha which was the largest in Kamsaar during Mughal and British Empire. The orchard when made had 40,000 trees of Mango and 60,00 trees of other fruits. Know the Orchard is small because his decedents later cut down the trees and build farms over there but still a Large part (about 400  Bigha) of the orchard. Other land is made farm know.

Histrorical Population

References 

Kaimur district
Dildarnagar
Dildarnagar Fatehpur
Cities and towns in Kaimur district
Towns and villages in Kamsar
Villages in Ghazipur district